Lee Grant (born Lyova Haskell Rosenthal; October 31, during the mid-1920s) is an American actress, documentarian, and director. For her film debut in 1951 as a young shoplifter in William Wyler's Detective Story, Grant earned an Oscar nomination for Best Supporting Actress and won the Best Actress Award at the 1952 Cannes Film Festival. Grant won the Best Supporting Actress Oscar for her role as Warren Beatty's older lover in Shampoo (1975).

In 1952, Grant was blacklisted from most acting jobs for 12 years, finding occasional work onstage or as a teacher during this period. She started to rebuild her screen acting career after she was removed from the blacklist in 1963. 

Grant starred in 71 TV episodes of Peyton Place (1965–1966), followed by lead roles in films such as Valley of the Dolls and In the Heat of the Night in 1967. In 1964, she won the Obie Award for Distinguished Performance by an Actress for her performance in The Maids. During her career, she won two Emmy Awards and was nominated seven times.

Grant later turned her focus to directing. In 1986, she won a Directors Guild of America Award for Nobody's Child. In 1987, the documentary she directed, Down and Out in America, tied for the Academy Award for Best Documentary Feature.

Early life
Lee Grant was born Lyova Haskell Rosenthal in Manhattan, the only child of Witia (née Haskell), a child care worker, and Abraham W. Rosenthal, a realtor and educator. Her father was born in New York City, to Polish Jewish immigrants, and her mother was a Russian Jewish immigrant. The family resided at 706 Riverside Drive in the Hamilton Heights neighborhood of Manhattan. Her date of birth is October 31, but the year is disputed, with all years ranging from 1925 to 1931 having been given as her year of birth at some point; however, census data, travel manifests, and testimony suggest that she was born in 1925 or 1926, while Grant's stated ages at the time of her professional debut and Oscar nomination indicate she was born in 1927.

Grant made her stage debut in L'Oracolo at the Metropolitan Opera in 1931 and later joined the American Ballet as an adolescent. She attended Art Students League of New York, Juilliard School of Music, The High School of Music & Art, and George Washington High School, all in New York City. Grant graduated from high school, and won a scholarship to the Neighborhood Playhouse School of the Theatre, where she studied under Sanford Meisner. Grant undertook further study with Uta Hagen at the HB Studio. She later enrolled in the Actors Studio in New York.

Career

1930s–1950s
Grant had her first stage ballet performance in 1933 at the Metropolitan Opera House. In 1938, in her early teens, she was made a member of the American Ballet under George Balanchine. As an actress, Grant had her professional stage debut as understudy in Oklahoma in 1944. In 1948, she had her Broadway acting debut in Joy to the World. Grant established herself as a dramatic method actress on and off Broadway, earning praise for her first major role as a shoplifter in Detective Story in 1949.

She made her film debut two years later in the 1951 film version (Detective Story), starring Kirk Douglas, receiving her first Academy Award for Best Supporting Actress nomination, and winning the Best Actress Award at the Cannes Film Festival. She said she enjoyed working under director William Wyler, who helped guide her.

In 1951, she gave an impassioned eulogy at the memorial service for actor J. Edward Bromberg, whose early death, she implied, was caused by the stress of being called before the House Un-American Activities Committee (HUAC). Her name soon after appeared in the publication Red Channels, and as a result, for the next twelve years, her "prime years" as she put it, she was blacklisted and her work in television and movies was limited.

Kirk Douglas, who acted with her in Detective Story, recalled that director Edward Dmytryk, a blacklistee, had first named her husband at the HUAC:

Grant appeared in a number of plays and in a few small television roles during her blacklisted years. In 1953, she played Rose Peabody in the soap opera Search for Tomorrow. On stage, Grant starred in the Broadway production of Two for the Seesaw in 1959, she succeeded Anne Bancroft in the lead female role.  That same year, she had a supporting role in the romantic drama Middle of the Night.

1960s

By the time Grant's name was removed from the blacklist in the mid-1960s, she had a daughter, Dinah, and divorced. Grant began re-establishing her television and movie career. In her autobiography, she writes: Her experience with the blacklist scarred her to such an extent that as late as 2002, she would freeze and go into a "near trance" when anyone asked her about her experiences during the McCarthy period.

Grant's first major achievement, after HUAC officially cleared her, was in the 1960s television series Peyton Place as Stella Chernak, for which she won an Emmy in 1966. In 1963, she won acclaim for her stage performance in the off-Broadway production of Jean Genet's The Maids. In 1967, she played the distraught widow of a murder victim in the Oscar-winning In the Heat of the Night. In 1968, Grant appeared in an episode of Mission Impossible, portraying the wife of a U.S. diplomat who goes undercover to discredit a rogue diplomat. In 1969, she had supporting roles in the crime drama The Big Bounce and science fiction drama Marooned, but they were not successful.

1970s
Grant received three Academy Award nominations in the 1970s for The Landlord (1970), Shampoo (1975), and Voyage of the Damned (1976).  In Plaza Suite (1971), a successful comedy directed by Arthur Hiller and written by Neil Simon; she played the harried mother of a bride, with Walter Matthau as the father.

In March 1971, Grant played the murderer in the Columbo episode "Ransom for a Dead Man", playing opposite Peter Falk's Lieutenant Columbo. For that role, she was nominated for an Emmy as Outstanding Lead Actress – Miniseries or a Movie. That same year, she also received a second Emmy nomination in the same category of Outstanding Single Performance by an Actress in a Leading Role for her performance in the television film The Neon Ceiling, which she won.

Grant reunited with Peter Falk on Broadway in the original production of The Prisoner of Second Avenue, written by Neil Simon; the playwright said that his "first and only choice" for the part was Grant, who he said was equally at home with dramatists such as Chekhov or Sidney Kingsley, yet could also be "hilariously funny" when the script called for it, for she was able to portray essential honesty in her acting.

Grant won an Oscar for Best Supporting Actress playing Warren Beatty's older lover in Shampoo (1975). The film was Columbia's biggest hit in the studio's 50-year history. Shampoo was the second film in which Grant acted under director Hal Ashby. Critic Pauline Kael, comparing her in both films, noted Grant "is such a cool-style comedienne that she's in danger of having people say that she's good, as usual." During the filming, however, she did have some serious disagreements with Beatty, who was also the producer, and nearly quit. During one scene, she wanted to play it in a way she felt was more realistic from a woman's perspective, but Beatty disagreed. After thinking about the scene for a few days, she told director Ashby that she could not do it Beatty's way and was quitting. As she was walking out, Beatty stopped her, and asked what was wrong. "I sat down and told him," she said. "He threw up his hands and said, 'Play it your way. What do I know? I'm a man.'"

Despite the success of the film and her career, Grant was feeling less secure in Hollywood, as she was then around 50 years old. She writes:

During the 1975-76 television season, she starred in the sitcom Fay, which, to her chagrin, was canceled after eight episodes. In 1977, she starred in the ensemble disaster movie Airport '77 and in 1978, she was the lead actress in the horror film Damien: Omen II, also starring William Holden.  Both films drew negative reviews, though they were financially successful.  She made a guest appearance in Empty Nest, in which her daughter Dinah Manoff co-starred.

In the late 1970s, Grant was asked by the American Film Institute to participate in the first AFI Directing Workshop for Women. During the workshop, Grant successfully moved into directing when she adapted the play The Stronger in 1976, written by August Strindberg.

1980s1990s
In 1980, Grant directed her first feature film, Tell Me a Riddle, a story about an aging Jewish couple. That debut narrative film was followed by a widely distributed documentary film titled The Willmar 8, which profiled eight female employees of a bank in Willmar, Minnesota who went on strike to protest pay inequities between male and female bank tellers. Grant went on to direct many documentaries on a variety of social issues: women in prison with When Women Kill (1983), transgender individuals with What Sex Am I? (1985), women experiencing domestic abuse with Battered (1989), and women trying to keep custody of their children in court in Women on Trial (1992).

In 1986, Grant directed Down and Out in America (1986) which won the Academy Award for Documentary Feature. The film was about farm workers losing their farms, homelessness, and unemployment in America. The same year, she directed Nobody's Child, a television movie starring Marlo Thomas about a woman confined to a mental institution for 20 years. Grant became the first female director to win the Directors Guild of America Award.

She starred in an HBO remake of Plaza Suite in 1982, co-starring with Jerry Orbach, both playing three different characters in three acts. It was filmed before a live audience. Actor Bruce Dern, who acted with her in The Big Town (1987), recalls working with her: "Lee Grant is a fabulous actress. Anytime she works it's a blessing you have her in your movie."

In 1988, she was awarded the Women in Film Crystal Award for outstanding women who through their endurance and the excellence of their work have helped to expand the role of women within the entertainment industry.

Admiring her directing and acting skill, actress Sissy Spacek agreed to act in  the romantic comedy Hard Promises (1991) "only to work with Grant", although Grant was later replaced as its director. In 1992, Grant played Dora Cohn, the mother of Roy Cohn in the biographical made-for-TV film Citizen Cohn, which garnered her another Primetime Emmy Award nomination. In 1994, she directed the television film Seasons of the Heart, starring Carol Burnett and George Segal.

2000s–present
In 2001, Lee Grant portrayed Louise Bonner in David Lynch's critically acclaimed Mulholland Drive. From 2004 to 2007, Carlin Glynn, Stephen Lang, and Grant served as co-artistic directors for the Actors Studio. In the early 2000s, Grant directed a series of Intimate Portrait episodes for Lifetime Television, that celebrated a diverse range of accomplished women.

In 2013, Grant briefly returned to the stage, after a nearly forty-year absence, to star in one performance of The Gin Game, part of a benefit for improvement programs at the Island Music Guild, in Bainbridge Island, Washington. Grant played Fonsia Dorsey opposite Frank Buxton as Weller Martin; her daughter Dinah Manoff directed the production.

After a fourteen-year hiatus, Lee Grant played a small part in the film Killian & the Comeback Kids (2020), directed by Taylor A. Purdee.

Grant's career making documentaries in the 1980s and 1990s was honored with an appearance on the American Film Institute's AFI Docs at its Guggenheim Symposium and with a program, "20th Century Woman: The Documentary Films of Lee Grant", on AFI Silver and other virtual cinemas in mid-2020. This became the first virtual repertory film series in America.

In speaking about the Me Too movement Grant has said “I was never in contact with a producer who hit on me in an uncomfortable way, I never had that experience...maybe because I wasn't [as young]."

As of 2022, she is still the only Academy Award-winning actor to also direct an Academy Award-winning documentary.

Filmography

Actress

Director

Awards and nominations

Notes

References

Further reading
; excerpts at CBSnews.com CBS Sunday Morning.

External links

 

Lee Grant at the University of Wisconsin's Actors Studio audio collection

1920s births
20th-century American actresses
21st-century American actresses
Living people
American people of Polish-Jewish descent
American people of Russian-Jewish descent
American women film directors
Actresses from New York City
American film actresses
American soap opera actresses
American stage actresses
American television actresses
American television directors
Best Supporting Actress Academy Award winners
Cannes Film Festival Award for Best Actress winners
Directors of Best Documentary Feature Academy Award winners
George Washington Educational Campus alumni
Outstanding Performance by a Supporting Actress in a Drama Series Primetime Emmy Award winners
Obie Award recipients
Outstanding Performance by a Lead Actress in a Miniseries or Movie Primetime Emmy Award winners
American women television directors
Hollywood blacklist
Jewish American actresses
Film directors from New York City
Age controversies
The High School of Music & Art alumni
Year of birth uncertain
21st-century American Jews